Tetracobalt dodecacarbonyl is the chemical compound with the formula Co4(CO)12. It is a black crystalline compound that is insoluble in water and easily oxidized by air. It is an example of a metal carbonyl cluster.

Synthesis and structure
This compound is synthesized by decarbonylation of Co2(CO)8.
2 Co2(CO)8 → Co4(CO)12 + 4 CO

The molecule consists of a tetrahedral Co4 core, but the molecular symmetry is C3v.  Three carbonyl ligands are bridging ligands and nine are terminal. The average Co-Co distance is 2.499 Å, the average C-O bond length is 1.133 Å, and the average Co-C-O angle is 177.5°.

Rh4(CO)12 adopts the same C3v structure but Ir4(CO)12 has perfect Td symmetry with no bridging CO ligands groups. The Rh4 and Ir4 clusters are more thermally robust than that of the Co4 compound, reflecting the usual trend in the strengths of metal-metal bond for second and third row metals vs those for the first row metals. There has been disagreement between the theoretically predicted and experimental structure of tetracobalt dodecacarbonyl.

References

Cobalt complexes
Carbonyl complexes